Keiver Josué Fernández Moronta (born 18 September 1996) is a Venezuelan professional boxer who has held the WBA Fedelatin super flyweight title since June 2021.

Early years
Fernández was born on 18 September 1996 in Maracay, but grew up in Santa Cruz de Aragua. He began boxing at the Estadio José Inés Martínez at the age of 13 to avoid falling into a street life of crime.

Professional career
Fernández made his professional debut on 14 December 2013, defeating Dionis Martínez by first-round knockout at the Parque Naciones Unidas in Caracas. He won his first nine bouts before managing a majority draw against Nohel Arambulet on 23 April 2016. In his next fight five months later he competed outside of Venezuela for the first time, beating Israel Hidrogo by unanimous decision in Panama City. It was the beginning of an 11-fight win streak between 2016 and 2019. After accumulating a 20–0–1 record, Fernández earned a fight against fellow undefeated prospect Orlando Peñalba for the vacant WBO Latino super flyweight title. On 8 February 2020, he suffered the first defeat of his career after the judges awarded Peñalba a split decision victory in Panama City.

On 19 June 2021, Fernández defeated Keyvin Lara via split decision to win the vacant WBA Fedelatin super flyweight title, with the judges' scorecards reading 86–85, 86–85 and 85–86. Fernández made his first WBA Fedelatin title defense against Pablo Macario on 19 March 2022. He retained the title by unanimous decision, with two scorecards of 97–93 and one scorecard of 98–92.

Professional boxing record

References

External links
 

Living people
1996 births
Venezuelan male boxers
Flyweight boxers
Super-flyweight boxers
Sportspeople from Maracay